Marie-Louise-Taos Amrouche (born 4 March 1913 in Tunis, Tunisia; died 2 April 1976 in Saint-Michel-l'Observatoire, France) was an Algerian writer and singer. In 1947, she became the first Algerian woman to publish a novel.

Biography 
She was born to a family of Kabyle Roman Catholic converts, the only daughter in a family of six sons. Her family had moved to Tunisia to escape persecution after their conversion.

Her mother Fadhma Aït Mansour, who was a famous Kabyle singer, had a great impact on her life, and her literary style would reflect the oral traditions of the Kabylie Berber people of her mother's heritage. Amrouche received her elementary and secondary education in Tunis, and in 1935 went to France for studies at the École Normale at Sèvres. From 1936, in collaboration with her elder brother Jean Amrouche and her mother, Amrouche collected and began to interpret Kabyle songs. In 1939, at the Congrès de Chant de Fès, she received a scholarship to study at the Casa Velasquez in Spain, where she researched the ties between Berber and Spanish popular songs.

Her autobiographical first novel, Jacinthe noir, was published in 1947 and is one of the earliest ever published in French by a North African woman writer. With her compilation of tales and poems La Grain magique in 1966, she took the nom de plume Marguerite-Taos, Marguerite being her mother's Christian name.

While she wrote in French, she sang in Kabyle. Her first album Chants berbères de Kabylie (1967), which was a great success, was a collection of traditional Kabyle songs that had been translated into French by her brother Jean. She recorded several other albums, including Chants sauvés de l’oubli ("Songs Saved from Oblivion"), Hommage au chant profond ("Homage to a Profound Song"), Incantations, méditations et danses sacrées berbères (1974), and Chants berbères de la meule et du berceau (1975).

She was an activist in Berber issues and was among the founders of Académie berbère in 1966.

She died in Saint-Michel-l'Observatoire in France.

Bibliography 
 Jacinthe noire (1947) – reprint Joëlle Losfeld (1996), 
 La Grain magique (1966) – reprint La Découverte (2000), 
 Rue des tambourins (1969) – reprint Joëlle Losfeld (1996), 
 L’Amant imaginaire (1975)

Selected discography 
 Chants berbères de Kabylie (1967)
 Chants De L'Atlas (Traditions Millénaires Des Berbères D'Algérie) (1970)
 Incantations, méditations et danses sacrées berbères (1974)
 Chants berbères de la meule et du berceau (1975)
 Au Théatre De La Ville (1977)

Further reading 
 Denise Brahimi, Taos Amrouche, romancière, Joëlle Losfeld (1995),

References

External links 
 Bio details, bibliomonde.net – in French
 

1913 births
1976 deaths
Writers from Tunis
Kabyle people
Algerian Roman Catholics
Algerian women novelists
Algerian novelists
20th-century Algerian women writers
20th-century novelists
Berber Christians
Berber writers
Berber musicians
20th-century  Algerian women singers